Mephisto Walz are an American rock band formed in 1985. The band's discography includes many full-length albums spanning nearly three decades, through Cleopatra Records and other labels.

History

Bari-Bari's signature songwriting style and distinctive wall of chorus/delay-effected guitar sound makes Mephisto Walz instantly identifiable amongst other pioneers of deathrock.

Mephisto Walz was formed in 1986 by Barry Galvin (aka Bari-Bari) and John Schuman (Johann), following their departure from the influential deathrock band Christian Death. Bari-Bari had joined Christian Death as bassist while the iconic Rozz Williams was still vocalist (Williams left the band in 1985, with guitarist Valor Kand becoming its lead singer and principal songwriter).

Christian Death's 1985 album "Atrocities" and the EPs "The Wind Kissed Pictures" and "Believers of the Unpure" featured Bari-Bari, Johann (bass), and David Glass (drums), all of whom would feature in one or more incarnation of Mephisto Walz.

Following conflict with Kand, Bari-Bari and Johann departed Christian Death. The band's 1986 album "Atrocities" includes several tracks composed by Bari-Bari, notably "Tales of Innocence", "Strapping Me Down", and "Silent Thunder". Additionally, 1985's "The Wind Kissed Pictures" EP features Bari-Bari's "The Wind Kissed Pictures" and "Lacrima Christi", while the "Believers of the Unpure" single, released in ’86, includes his composition "Between Youth".

The first incarnation of Mephisto Walz started in Düsseldorf in February 1986, with original members Bari-Bari (the band's sole songwriter), Johann, and Arndt (drums), plus a German vocalist called Jörge. The name Mephisto Walz was proposed by Johann. They rehearsed songs mainly written by Bari-Bari, but also added soundscapes such as “Aboriginee Requiem”. The band's eponymous debut album was released on Italian label Supporti Fonografici that same year. In 1987 they moved to Los Angeles, without Johann.

In 1988, Bari-Bari started working on tracks with Steven Grey in Hollywood at a studio where the former worked. They regrouped with David Hermon (bass), Mondo (vox) and Nariki Shimooka (guitar). Playing the first EP and some of Bari-Bari's Christian Death material they added new songs that would later be released on the “Crocosmia”, “Terra-Regina” and “Thalia” albums. During this period, songs that would later become "Mephisto Walz Rarities 1989" were recorded live in studio.

In 1991, Christianna was brought in as vocalist as Bari-Bari felt that male vocals were too similar to Williams and Christian Death. William Faith was added on bass at the same time. An association with Gymnastic Records was started with the compilation "American Gothic", which featured Mephisto Walz's "Tangia". “Crocosmia” was then recorded for European release, consisting of new tracks and some older tracks redone with Christianna on vocals.

In 1992, a co-headlined tour with Shadow Project (featuring Williams and Eva O) brought Mephisto Walz back to Germany, where they stayed and recorded "As Apostles Forget". Bari-Bari also wrote part of what would be “Terra-Regina” and “Thalia”, before returning to the U.S. 
In Los Angeles, Johann and Glass were available again and replaced Faith and Grey. Work then began with Bari-Bari and Christianna on the next three complete releases - "Eternal Deep", "Terra-Regina" and "Thalia", through new label Cleopatra Records.

In 1994-1999, Bari-Bari and Christianna completed cover singles for Cleopatra, as well as "Early Recordings" and "Immersion". The recordings were made with Bari-Bari (all music) and Christianna (vocals). The "Nightingale" EP was recorded by Bari-Bari and Christianna in 2002 for the Fossil Dungeon label, followed by the album "Insidious" in 2004.

For the next few years, Bari-Bari played and recorded with Scarlet's Remains and recorded bands in his L.A. studio.

In 2011 "IIIrd Incarnation" was recorded with both Bari-Bari and Sara Reid on vocals. A more aggressive guitar style was reintroduced. Two years later, "New Apostles" was recorded with Bari-Bari and Myriam Galvin now on vocals. It featured Christian Omar Madrigal Izzo on four tracks. 2017's "Scoundrel” was written and recorded by Bari-Bari and Myriam, with Omar Madrigal Izzo again performing on select songs.

Discography

Albums and EP

 1992: Crocosmia (Compilation)
 1992: As Apostles Forget (EP)
 1993: Terra-Regina
 1994: The Eternal Deep
 1995: Thalia
 1995: Mosaique (Compilation)
 1998: Immersion
 2000: Early Recordings 1985–1988 (Compilation)
 2004: Insidious
 2011: IIIrd Incarnation
 2013: New Apostles
 2017: Scoundrel
 2018: Immersion II
 2018: Rarities 1989 (Compilation)
 2020: All These Winding Roads

Exclusive tracks appearing on compilations
Gothik: Music from the Dark Side – "Mephisto Walz"
Gothic Erotica – "Israel"
Dancing on Your Grave – "Facade"
Künstler Zum 13. Wave-Gotik-Treffen – "Before These Crimes"
Sonic Seducer – Cold Hands Seduction Vol. 39 – "One Day Less"
Strobe Lights Vol. 2 – "Hunter's Trail (Strobe Light Mix)"
Kaliffornian Deathrock – "Eternal Deep"
Virgin Voices - "Skin" (Madonna cover)
Gothic Daydreams - "One Less Day"

References

External links
 
 Morbid Outlook Interview with Bary Galvin, a.k.a. Bari-bari
 Complete Discography

American death rock groups
American gothic rock groups
Musical groups established in 1985